Küçük means "small" in Turkish and may refer to:

People

Epithet
 Küçük Ali (died 1804), also known as Ali Đevrlić, Ottoman janissary and civil servant
 Kuchuk Hanem (fl. 1850–1870), Ghawazi famed beauty and dancer
 Küçük Mehmet Sait Pasha (1830–1914), Ottoman statesman
 Küçük Mustafa (died 1422), Ottoman prince

Surname
 Fazıl Küçük (1906–1984), Turkish Cypriot politician
 İrsen Küçük (1940–2019), Turkish Cypriot politician
 Veli Küçük (born 1944), Turkish retired general
 Yalçın Küçük (born 1938), Turkish socialist writer, philosopher, economist, and historian

Places
 Küçük Mecidiye Mosque, Ottoman-era mosque in the Beşiktaş district of Istanbul, Turkey
 Küçüklü (disambiguation), various places in Turkey
 Küçükmenderes River, in Turkey
 Küçük Tavşan Adası, pair of adjacent Turkish islands located in the Aegean Sea north of Gölköy, in Bodrum
 Küçük Tiyatro, theatre in Ankara, Turkey

Media
 Küçük Kovboy, 1973 Turkish Western film

See also
 , since this is a common prefix
 Büyük (disambiguation), antonym, "big"